Pinegrove, an American rock band, have released five studio albums, four live albums, one compilation album, three extended plays (EPs), twelve singles, and four music videos.

Albums

Studio albums

Live albums

Compilation albums

Extended plays

Singles

Videography

Music videos

References

External links

Discographies of American artists
Rock music group discographies
Alternative rock discographies